The Grammy Award for Best Performance by a Vocal Group was awarded from 1961 to 1968.  In its first year, the award specified that a "vocal group" contains two to six artists.  This award was presented alongside the award for Best Performance by a Chorus.  Before 1961 these awards were combined into the Grammy Award for Best Performance by a Vocal Group or Chorus.

Although in the "pop" field the award did not specify pop music performances and, in some years, ran alongside the award now presented as the Grammy Award for Best Pop Performance by a Duo or Group with Vocal.

Years reflect the year in which the Grammy Awards were presented, for works released in the previous year.

Recipients

References

Performance by a Vocal Group